Edward Maybank (born 11 October 1956) is an English former professional footballer who played for Chelsea, Fulham and Brighton & Hove Albion in The Football League between 1974 and 1980 and subsequently for PSV Eindhoven in the Netherlands. Following his release from PSV, Maybank signed for Sussex County League side Whitehawk in December 1983 and made a small number of appearances in the 1983–84 season.

References

Living people
1956 births
Footballers from the London Borough of Lambeth
Association football forwards
English footballers
English expatriate footballers
Chelsea F.C. players
Fulham F.C. players
Brighton & Hove Albion F.C. players
PSV Eindhoven players
Eredivisie players
Expatriate footballers in the Netherlands
Whitehawk F.C. players